In enzymology, a phosphoglycerate kinase (GTP) is an enzyme that catalyzes the chemical reaction

GTP + 3-phospho-D-glycerate  GDP + 3-phospho-D-glyceroyl phosphate

Thus, the two substrates of this enzyme are GTP and 3-phospho-D-glycerate, whereas its two products are GDP and 3-phospho-D-glyceroyl phosphate.

This enzyme belongs to the family of transferases, specifically those transferring phosphorus-containing groups (phosphotransferases) with a carboxy group as acceptor.  The systematic name of this enzyme class is GTP:3-phospho-D-glycerate 1-phosphotransferase.

References

 

EC 2.7.2
Enzymes of unknown structure